This is a list of the Maryland state historical markers in Anne Arundel County.

This is intended to be a complete list of the official state historical markers placed in Anne Arundel County, Maryland by the Maryland Historical Trust (MHT). The locations of the historical markers, as well as the latitude and longitude coordinates as provided by the MHT's database, are included below. There are currently 48 historical markers located in Anne Arundel County.

References

Anne Arundel County